The Crash is a 1932 American pre-Code drama film directed by William Dieterle. The film is based on the 1932 novel Children of Pleasure written by Larry Barretto, and stars Ruth Chatterton as a luxury-loving wife devastated by the Wall Street crash of 1929.

Plot
Linda Gault comes from a poverty-stricken family and is determined never to be poor again. She is now a philandering elitist who casually seduces men for their money. Her stockbroker husband Geoffrey has found out about his wife's infidelities, and  encourages her to collect investment recommendations from her latest lover, high-profile financier John Fair. Linda is unamused with her husband's desire, claiming that finances have killed their loving marriage. Nevertheless, she does as her husband asks, and afterwards feels ashamed about it.

Having tired of Fair, she breaks off their affair. Unaware of this, Geoffrey insists she get the latest inside information from Fair, as the stock market is behaving very strangely. Suspicious of Linda's rapid about face, Fair refuses to tell her anything. Not wanting to admit that she was unable to charm her ex-lover, Linda lies to her husband, telling him the market will rise. As a result, Geoffrey loses all of his money in the Wall Street Crash of 1929. Unwilling to deal with being impoverished, Linda persuades her husband to pay for her extended stay in Bermuda, using some of the money he needs to try to recover.

There, she is romanced by Ronnie Sanderson, an Australian sheep rancher. Ronnie proposes that Linda live with him in Australia, but she hesitates to, feeling Australia has nothing to offer her. However, when she learns about her husband having become broke, she is eager to profit from Ronnie in every way possible. Linda is able to manipulate Ronnie into falling for her and he expresses his interest in marrying her if she first returns to New York City to divorce her husband.

Once in New York and announcing the divorce, Geoffrey reacts in laughter, telling her she will never marry a sheep rancher. Meanwhile, Linda's maid Celeste steals Linda's jewelry to save her boyfriend Arthur from jail. Linda now realizes she is completely broke and lands a job as a clothing store's clerk. She is surprised by a visit from Ronnie, who insists on taking her to Australia immediately. Geoffrey, who is not willing to let go his wife, warns Ronnie about Linda's spoiled character, but Ronnie does not feel threatened.

On the evening Linda is leaving, Geoffrey confronts Fair with losing all of his money because of Fair's supposed statement to Linda. They initially quarrel, but in the end, Geoffrey receives some of the money he lost as a loan. Back home, he receives a visit from Linda, who has come to say goodbye. They realize the faults they have made in the past and are reconciled. Linda tears up Fair's check.

Cast
Ruth Chatterton as Linda Gault
George Brent as Geoffrey Gault
Lois Wilson as Marcia Peterson
Barbara Leonard as Celeste, the maid
Paul Cavanagh as Ronald 'Ronnie' Sanderson
Henry Kolker as John 'Jack' Fair
Hardie Albright as Arthur Pringle
Ivan F. Simpson as Hodge, the butler
Skippy as Dog eating bone in kitchen

Home media
It is available on DVD from the Warner Archive label paired as a double feature with Registered Nurse.

References

External links

1932 films
1932 drama films
American black-and-white films
Films based on American novels
Films directed by William Dieterle
Films set in the 1920s
First National Pictures films
Films about financial crises
American drama films
1930s English-language films
1930s American films